Nylon 1,6 (aka polyamide 1,6) is a type of polyamide or nylon. Unlike most other nylons, nylon 1,6 is not a condensation polymer, but instead is formed by an acid-catalyzed synthesis from adiponitrile, formaldehyde, and water. The material was produced and studied by researchers at DuPont in the 1950s.  Synthesis can be performed at room temperature in open beakers.

Synthesis of nylon 1,6 
Nylon 1,6 is synthesized from adiponitrile, formaldehyde, and water by acid catalysis. Adiponitrile and formaldehyde (aqueous, paraformaldehyde, or trioxane) are combined with an acid (typically sulfuric acid) in a reactor. The reaction can be performed at room temperature.  However, the reaction is exothermic, and especially at high ratios of formaldehyde to adiponitrile, cooling may be required.

CH2O + NC-(CH2)4-CN + H2O → [-NH-CH2-NH-OC-(CH2)4-CO-]n

Addition of water to the reaction mixture readily precipitates the nylon 1,6 product, which can then be isolated and washed with water to afford high purity polymer.

Properties and applications 
The DuPont evaluations of the 1950s era indicated that polyamide-1,6 was less acid stable than nylon 66, and melts over 300–325 °C, with some decomposition.  However, films were reported to have been successfully pressed at 275–290 °C.  Molecular weight determined to be ~22,000–34,000 via an osmotic pressure method. The polymer was believed to be significantly branched and cross-linked owing to side reactions occurring during the acid catalyzed polymerization, but this was not conclusively established.

Similar to other formaldehyde-based thermoset resins, thermal behavior of the polymer is a function of the CH2O/ADN ratio employed in the synthesis.  

Melting point was found to increase with increasing synthesis CH2O/ADN ratio, along with apparent increase in cross-linking, and reduction in crystallinity.  Additionally, spectral features of 1H-NMR of nylon 1,6 samples were found to trend with CH2O/ADN synthesis ratio as well.  Collectively, these properties parallel those of other formaldehyde-based thermoset resins, and it is interesting that nylon 1,6 is a rare example of a polyamide thermoset resin rather than a thermoplastic material.

Nylon 1,6 has been reported to exhibit a high moisture absorbance owing to the significant density of amide residues in the polymer, >130% of its weight (compare to ~2–2.5% for nylon 66 and nylon 6).

References 

Polyamides